The 1972 Tennessee Volunteers football team (variously "Tennessee", "UT" or the "Vols") represented the University of Tennessee in the 1972 NCAA University Division football season. Playing as a member of the Southeastern Conference (SEC), the team was led by head coach Bill Battle, in his third year, and played their home games at Neyland Stadium in Knoxville, Tennessee. They finished the season with a record of ten wins and two losses (10–2 overall, 4–2 in the SEC) and a victory over LSU in the 1972 Astro-Bluebonnet Bowl.  The Volunteers offense scored 297 points while the defense allowed 100 points.

Schedule

Rankings

Team players drafted into the NFL

References

Tennessee
Tennessee Volunteers football seasons
Bluebonnet Bowl champion seasons
Tennessee Volunteers football